Colonia Dora is a municipality and village in Santiago del Estero Province in Argentina.

References

Jewish Argentine settlements
Populated places in Santiago del Estero Province